Faridabad railway station is on the Agra–Delhi chord. It is located in Faridabad district in the Indian state of Haryana. It serves Faridabad and surrounding areas.

History
The Agra–Delhi chord was opened in 1904. Some parts of it were relaid during the construction of New Delhi (inaugurated in 1927–28).

Electrification
The Faridabad–Mathura–Agra section was electrified in 1982–85.

Suburban railway
Faridabad is part of the Delhi Suburban Railway and is served by EMU trains.

Amenities
Faridabad railway station has telephone booth, computerized booking office, waiting room, and refreshment room. Distance from Faridabad railway station: Delhi–Haryana Badarpur border 10.2 km, Mehrauli 23.6 km, and India Gate 27 km.

References

External links
Trains at Faridabad

Railway stations in Faridabad district
Delhi railway division
Transport in Faridabad